Independence Mall may refer to:

United States

Kingston Collection, formerly known as The Independence Mall, Plymouth County, Massachusetts
Independence Center, Independence, Missouri
Independence Mall (North Carolina), Wilmington, North Carolina
Independence Mall (Philadelphia), Philadelphia, Pennsylvania

See also
 Independence Plaza (disambiguation)
 Independence Centre (disambiguation)
 Independence Building, several structures
 Independence (disambiguation)